Brandhill is a hamlet in Shropshire, England.

Villages in Shropshire